Football Club Bengaluru United is an Indian professional football club based in Bangalore, Karnataka. The club competed in 2021 I-League Qualifiers. Founded in 2018, the club mainly participated in local competitions including Bangalore Super Division, before participating in the I-League 2nd Division for the 2019–20 season.

History

Bengaluru United was founded in 2018 and began playing the Bangalore Super Division for the 2018–19 season. Their first match was on 25 October 2018 against Kickstart FC where they were defeated 4–2. The club earned their first victory in their next match on 30 October against South United 3–0. After 13 matches, Bengaluru United finished their first season in fifth place on 23 points, 11 behind Bengaluru FC.

Prior to the next season, Bengaluru United signed former India international Gouramangi Singh as a first-team coach under Richard Hood. The team started the Super Division 2019–20 season with a 4–1 victory over ASC. This time the club finished as runners-up, behind Bengaluru FC on goal difference.

In January 2020, it was announced that Bengaluru United would participate in the I-League 2nd Division, India's third tier competition. The club were placed into Group C, alongside ARA, FC Kerala, and the reserve teams for Indian Super League clubs Goa, Kerala Blasters, and Mumbai City. Their first match in the national league was on 29 January 2020 against Goa at the Nagoa Ground. A goal from striker Amey Bhatkal gave Bengaluru United a 1–0 victory. Despite the performance, the COVID-19 pandemic in India managed to postpone the 2nd Division season from being concluded. The club were in second in the table from eight matches.

In March 2021, Bengaluru United was crowned champions of the 2020–21 season of the BDFA Super Division League. The club finished atop the points table with 31 points, having won 10 out of their 12 matches. 

Ahead of the 2021–22 I-League Qualifiers, Bengaluru roped in Slovenian Luka Majcen as their third foreigner after the Trinidadian duo Robert Primus and Daniel Carr. They began 2021–22 season journey, with a 1–0 win against Central Reserve Police Force at the 2021 Durand Cup, but the journey ended after a 4–2 defeat to Mohammedan Sporting in semi-finals.

Bengaluru United retain the BDFA Super Division title, after winning the 2021–22 season, stacking up 13 wins and a draw. In May 2022, the club appointed Khalid Jamil as new head coach. In 2023, the club participated in Stafford Challenge Cup and clinched title defeating Chennaiyin FC (R) in final.

Kit manufacturers and shirt sponsors

Stadium

Bengaluru United plays its home matches of both I-League qualifiers, and Bangalore Super Division, at the Bangalore Football Stadium in Bangalore, Karnataka. The stadium previously had a capacity of nearly 40,000 spectators. Opened in 1971, it currently has artificial turf.

Players

Coaching staff

Statistics and records

Season-by-season

Affiliated clubs

The following club(s) is/are currently associated with FC Bengaluru United:

  Sevilla FC (2021–present)

Notable players

Past and present internationals
The following Bengaluru United players have been capped at full international level. Years in brackets indicate their spells at the club.

  Robert Primus (2020–2021)
  Daniel Clive Carr (2021)
  Mohamad Kdouh (2022–present)

Managerial history
  D. Manivannan (2018–2019)
  Richard Reginald Hood (2019–2020; 2020–2022)
  Gouramangi Singh (2020)
  Khalid Jamil (2022–2023)
  Fernando Santiago Varela (2023–present)

Partnership

In 2021, FC Bengaluru United and La Liga side Sevilla FC have formalised their agreement to collaborate for the next five years. With this partnership agreement, Sevilla FC look to strengthen their presence in the Indian football market, one of the fastest growing markets in the world. They will also explore opportunities to establish shared football schools. Sevilla FC will assist to the Indian club in various aspects, sports management, data analysis, talent spotting, player development and performance optimisation and the use of sports technology.

For Bengaluru United, owned by Gaurav Manchanda, this represents an opportunity to learn from vast sporting experience of Sevilla. As part of the agreement, fans will be able to see FC Bengaluru United as well as their academy players in traditional white and red colours of Sevilla from the start of the 2021–22 season in the I-League 2nd Division.

Other departments

Women's team
In March 2022, FC Bengaluru united marked their foray into women's football with the launch of their Women's KSFA B Division team. The team was launched on 8 March on Women's day and they represents the best in local talent and marks an important milestone in the growth and development of women's football in the state.

Youth men's
Bengaluru United has youth men's football section, that competes primarily in KSFA Youth League. Club's academy teams usually play under three age categories, U12, U14, and U17. Their U21 team participated in "south zone" qualifiers of the 2023 Reliance Foundation Development League.

Honours

League
I-League 2nd Division
Third place (1): 2019–20                  
Bangalore Super Division
Champions (2): 2020–21, 2021–22
Runners-up (1): 2022–23
Third place (1): 2019–20

Cup
Stafford Challenge Cup
Champions (1): 2023

Awards
 World Football Summit Award: 2021

See also
 List of football clubs in India

References

External links

FC Bengaluru United at Soccerway
 FC Bengaluru United at the-aiff.com
 Team profile at Global Sports Archive

 
2018 establishments in Karnataka
Association football clubs established in 2018
Bangalore Super Division
Football clubs in Bangalore
I-League 2nd Division clubs